M101 or M-101 most often refers to:
 Messier 101, or the Pinwheel Galaxy, a spiral galaxy
 M101 howitzer, a 105 mm light howitzer

M101 or M-101 may also refer to:

 Myasishchev M-101T Gzhel, an aircraft produced in Russia
 Line M101 (Beijing Subway), a metro line under construction in Beijing, scheduled to open in 2027
 M101 (New York City bus), a bus route in Manhattan
 Hammond Organ, a Hammond Spinet Organ
 M-101 (Michigan highway), a state highway in Michigan
 HMS Sandown (M101), British naval ship commissioned in 1989, decommissioned in 2005.
 M-101 German Kriegsmarine minesweeper

pt:M101